Kelly McKee (born June 16, 1992) is a Canadian water polo player who is a member of the Canada women's national water polo team.

Career
McKee was part of Canada's silver medal winning team at the 2019 Pan American Games in Lima. This qualified the team for the 2020 Summer Olympics.

In June 2021, Walker was named to Canada's 2020 Olympic team.

References 

1992 births
Living people
Canadian female water polo players
Sportspeople from Calgary
California Golden Bears women's water polo players
Hawaii Rainbow Warriors and Rainbow Wahine athletes
Medalists at the 2019 Pan American Games
Pan American Games medalists in water polo
Pan American Games silver medalists for Canada
Water polo players at the 2019 Pan American Games
Water polo players at the 2020 Summer Olympics
Olympic water polo players of Canada